Giugnola is a village in central Italy, administratively divided into two frazioni of the two municipalities of Castel del Rio (in Emilia-Romagna) and Firenzuola (in Tuscany). , it had 67 inhabitants, 33 in the  Castel del Rio's frazione, and 34 in the Firenzuola's one.

Geography
Although it is not uncommon, in Italy, to find a village divided into two (or more) municipalities, or (rarely) into two provinces; Giugnola represents a rare case of a frazione divided into 2 regions.

It is located on the Tuscan Apennine, 2 km far from Piancaldoli, 10 from Castel del Rio, 25 from Firenzuola, 57 from Bologna, 73 from Prato and 93 from Florence.

Personalities
Antonio Bacci (1885-1971), Roman Catholic Cardinal
Leto Casini (1902-1992), Catholic Righteous Among the Nations

References

Frazioni of the Province of Bologna
Frazioni of the Province of Florence